Tippah County is a county located on the northern border of the U.S. state of Mississippi. As of the 2020 census, the population was 21,815. Its county seat is Ripley. The name "Tippah" is derived from a Chickasaw language word meaning "cut off." It was taken from the creek of the same name that flows across much of the original county from northeast to southwest before emptying into the Tallahatchie River. The creek probably was so named because it, and the ridges on either side, "cut off" the western part of the region from the eastern portion.

One of President Bill Clinton's great-grandfathers is buried here.

Geography

Major highways
  U.S. Highway 72
  Mississippi Highway 2
  Mississippi Highway 4
  Mississippi Highway 15

Adjacent counties
 Hardeman County, Tennessee (north)
 Alcorn County (northeast)
 Prentiss County (southeast)
 Union County (south)
 Benton County (west)

National protected area
 Holly Springs National Forest (part)

Demographics

2020 census

As of the 2020 United States Census, there were 21,815 people, 7,834 households, and 5,394 families residing in the county.

2000 census
At the 2000 census, there are 20,826 people, 8,108 households and 5,910 families residing in the county. The population density was 46 per square mile (18/km2). There were 8,868 housing units at an average density of 19 per square mile (7/km2). The racial makeup of the county was 81.85% White, 15.92% Black or African American, 0.20% Native American, 0.11% Asian, 0.01% Pacific Islander, 1.29% from other races, and 0.61% from two or more races. 2.08% of the population were Hispanic or Latino of any race.

As of 2000, there were 8,108 households, of which 33.70% had children under the age of 18 living with them, 57.20% were married couples living together, 11.80% had a female householder with no husband present, and 27.10% were non-families. 24.90% of all households were made up of individuals, and 11.40% had someone living alone who was 65 years of age or older. The average household size was 2.52 and the average family size was 3.00.

Age distribution was 25.00% under the age of 18, 10.10% from 18 to 24, 27.90% from 25 to 44, 22.50% from 45 to 64, and 14.50% who were 65 years of age or older. The median age was 36 years. For every 100 females there were 93.70 males. For every 100 females age 18 and over, there were 90.20 males.

The median household income was $29,300, and the median family income was $34,547. Males had a median income of $27,505 versus $20,446 for females. The per capita income for the county was $14,041  About 14.00% of families and 16.90% of the population were below the poverty line, including 19.00% of those under age 18 and 23.30% of those age 65 or over.

Communities

City
 Ripley (county seat)

Towns
 Blue Mountain
 Dumas
 Falkner
 Walnut

Census-designated place
 Chalybeate

Unincorporated communities
 Brownfield
 Tiplersville
 Lake Mohawk
 Dry Creek
 Cotton Plant
 Camp Hill

Media
 TippahNews.com

Politics

See also
 National Register of Historic Places listings in Tippah County, Mississippi

External links
 Tippah County - Official site.

References

 
Mississippi counties
Mississippi placenames of Native American origin
Counties of Appalachia
1836 establishments in Mississippi
Populated places established in 1836